Max Baldwin (born 4 January 1928) is an Australian canoeist who competed in the 1950s. He finished ninth in the K-1 10000 m event at the 1956 Summer Olympics in Melbourne.

Baldwin lost the use of his left leg due to polio at age one, and walks with crutches. Baldwin's first sport was gymnastics; despite his leg impairment, he won a NSW state championship title. After Baldwin started canoeing, he won several Australian titles. He was the first Australian athlete with a disability to compete in the Olympic Games. Baldwin was made a life member of Gymnastics NSW in 1990 and awarded the Medal of the Order of Australia in 2014, for services to sport.

References

External links
 
2018 interview with Baldwin

1928 births
Living people
Australian male canoeists
Canoeists at the 1956 Summer Olympics
Olympic canoeists of Australia
People with polio
Recipients of the Medal of the Order of Australia
Australian disabled sportspeople
20th-century Australian people